Love, Italian Style is a studio album recorded by American pop singer Connie Francis.

Background
During October 1966, Francis recorded several Italian language tracks at Milan Ricordi Studios in Rome, Italy. Some tracks were Italian language cover versions of her current US hits, such as Spanish Nights and You, while others were of Italian origin, such as "Regent's Park" (the theme song for an Italian television miniseries Melissa) and "Canta ragazzina," her entry for the 1967 edition of the Sanremo Festival.

The album was produced by Pete Spargo and engineered by Val Valentin; the orchestra was conducted by Iller Pattacini. The album consists of traditional Italian songs brought up to date with combined arrangements of traditional Italian instruments (e.g. mandolins) and modern instruments (e.g. electric guitars).

Francis sings all songs either entirely in Neapolitan, or bilingually in Neapolitan and English.


Track listing

Side A

Side B

Connie Francis albums
1967 albums
Italian-language albums
MGM Records albums